The 1970 Oregon gubernatorial election took place on November 3, 1970. Republican incumbent Tom McCall defeated Democratic nominee Robert W. Straub to win re-election.

Candidates

Democratic 
 Robert W. Straub, State Treasurer

Republican 
 Tom McCall, incumbent Governor of Oregon

Election results

References 

1970
Gubernatorial
Oregon
November 1970 events in the United States